Qaleh-ye Mohammad Beyg (also Romanized as Qal‘eh-ye Moḩammad Beyg; also known as Qal‘eh-ye Moḩammad Beyk) is a village in Galehzan Rural District, in the Central District of Khomeyn County, Markazi Province, Iran. At the 2006 census, its population was 15, in 5 families.

References 

Populated places in Khomeyn County